Sir Ronald Leslie Young  (born ) is a New Zealand jurist. He served as chief District Court judge from 1993 to 2001, and was a High Court judge from 2001 until 2015, when he retired. In the 2016 Queen's Birthday Honours, he was appointed a Knight Companion of the New Zealand Order of Merit, for services to the judiciary.

References

Year of birth missing (living people)
1950s births
Living people
District Court of New Zealand judges
High Court of New Zealand judges
Knights Companion of the New Zealand Order of Merit